Advancement may refer to:

Fronting (phonetics)
Advancement (inheritance)
Promotion (rank)
Fundraising

See also
 Advance (disambiguation)